Testimony: Vol. 1, Life & Relationship is the third studio album by American singer India Arie, released on June 27, 2006, by Motown. The album debuted at number one on the Billboard 200, selling 161,000 copies in its first week.

In 2007, the album was nominated for three Grammy Awards: Best R&B Album, Best R&B Song for "I Am Not My Hair", and Best Female R&B Vocal Performance for "I Am Not My Hair".

Critical reception

Testimony: Vol. 1, Life & Relationship received mixed reviews from music critics. At Metacritic, which assigns a normalized rating out of 100 to reviews from mainstream publications, the album received an average score of 53, based on 14 reviews. Some reviews are positive, like Billboard, for example, which gave the album a positive review and called it "An ambitious, aurally rich suite of storytelling songs." Hartford Courant gave it a positive review and said, "Of all today's self-actualizing soul singers, India.Arie represents the purest version of the concept. How much you'll like her brand of R&B depends in part on whether the word "nurturing" gives you the warm fuzzies or makes your skin crawl." On the other hand, Mojo gave it two stars out of five and said, "Lacking the wit and lyrical dexterity of a Jill Scott or the raw power of Angie Stone, the songs can feel airless and unengaged." Q also gave it two stars out of five and said that Arie's "sauntering melodies struggle under the weight of their worthy load."

Commercial performance
In the United States, Testimony: Vol. 1, Life & Relationship debuted at number one on the Billboard 200 and the Top R&B/Hip-Hop Albums charts with first-week sales of 161,000 copies, Arie's first number-one album on the Billboard 200 and second on the R&B chart. The following week, it fell to number three on the Billboard 200 with 69,000 copies sold. The album had sold 689,000 copies in the United States as of December 2008.

Track listing

Notes
  signifies an additional producer
  signifies a main and vocal producer

Charts

Weekly charts

Year-end charts

Certifications

References

2006 albums
Albums produced by Mark Batson
India Arie albums
Motown albums